Kamineni Institute of Medical Sciences is a private medical college associated with a 1050 bed teaching Hospital located in Narketpally village, Nalgonda District, Telangana state of India on NH65 about 80 kilometers (50 miles) from the city of Hyderabad. The medical college hospital serves rural population in and around Narketpally. The college campus is known for its beautiful landscapes and the serene atmosphere. Besides local students from the state, students from all over the world come here to pursue Bachelor of Medicine and Bachelor of Surgery (M.B.B.S.) Degree. The college is affiliated to Kaloji Narayana Rao University of Health Sciences and is approved by the Medical Council of India. The medical college is in the process of acquiring Deemed University status.

Inception and growth 
The first batch of the medical college started in 1999 with 100 students. The college was promoted by Sri Kamineni Suryanarayana - an engineer architect, builder and industrialist as a part of Kamineni Education Society. Since 1999, college has gained popularity because of the successful board results and the increasing patient population due to free surgeries conducted by the hospital. The number of students in a batch increased from 100 to 150 and medical PG courses like General Medicine, General Surgery, Radiology, Obstetrics and Gynecology, Pediatrics, Orthopedics, Psychiatry, ENT, Ophthalmology, etc. have been added subsequently. The medical college also participates in the sports meet conducted by the Dr. NTR University of Health Sciences every two years. In the year 2009, a project called Swasthya09 was initiated by the Kamineni students and staff to provide medical care and health awareness to the rural people.

Description 
 The college is equipped with many lecture halls with limited multimedia presentation aids, a 200-seat gallery hall and a 1000-seat auditorium.
 The library called Sahithi is the common library for all the courses which houses recognized text books and books on subjects pertaining to medicine along with scientific journals and papers. A digital library too is provided within the central library for educational purposes with state-of-the-art equipment, however its use is mostly restricted to students to allow them to focus on their studies. In addition to the Central Library all departments of the institution have their own Mini-Libraries with books of their subjects for the faculty.
 There are five girls' hostels Samhitha, Samskruthi, Samyuktha, Samatha and Sathbhavana [air conditioned] and a boys Samyami Hostel. The hostels are equipped with treated drinking water supply and coolers.
 There are two playgrounds with a common space for cricket, soccer, Hockey, Athletics and courts for basketball, Lawn Tennis and volleyball. Gyms are provided within hostels and study rooms are available on request to the Dean around the library. Staff quarters are provided for families.
 The institution emphasizes exclusively on the academic development of budding doctors and discourages lack of discipline amongst students strongly. The security levels of the institution are impressive with constant parole of guards to prevent any rule breaking and indiscipline. To maintain a standard level of decency, students are required to be dressed in uniforms whenever involved in matters related to the institution.
 The faculty and the management board are deeply involved in the education of the students and in their effort to produce doctors, extra-curricular activities as well as nurturing of hobbies besides academics are mostly frowned upon but not discouraged. The institution rewards toppers of all subjects in the course generously with monetary prizes as well as medals, it also assists deserving students with scholarships.
 The prize-giving ceremony is held on a day special and important to the institution, known as De-Addiction Day, held in the first week of August each year marking the establishment of a De-Addiction Center in the Kamineni Hospitals. This center brings the lives of many alcoholics and other addicts back on track with medication and constant encouragement and its anniversary is celebrated with great fanfare involving speeches by many well known personalities as well as performances by students.
 Hospital facilities include 12 operation theaters, a post-operative ward, Acute Medical Care Unit, Intensive Coronary Care Unit (ICCU), Respiratory Intensive Care Unit (RICU) besides super specialties like fledged Cardiology & Cardio Thoracic Surgery, Endocrinology, Gastroenterology, Nephrology, Urology, Neurology, Neurosurgery, Pediatric Surgery, Plastic Surgery and Transfusion Medicine departments.

Campus
 Kamineni Institute of Medical Sciences - Graduate and Post-graduate school of Medicine.
 Kamineni Institute of Dental Sciences
 Kamineni Institute of Medical Sciences School And College Of Nursing
 Kamineni Institute Of Paramedical Sciences
 Sree Vidya Peeth, Residential and day school.

Principals 
 Dr. K. Rajendra Babu (1999–2006)
 Dr.(Col) C.G.Wilson (2006–2011)
 Dr.(Col) G.S.Saiprasad (2011–2013)
 Dr. Shruti Mohanty (2013–present)

Departments

Pre-clinicals 
 Biochemistry
 Anatomy
 Physiology
 Pharmacology
 Microbiology
 Pathology
 Forensic Medicine
 Genetics

Clinicals 
 Ophthalmology
  ENT
 Community Medicine
 General Medicine
 General Surgery
 Pediatrics
  GYN/OBS
 Orthopedics
 Dermatology
 Psychiatry
 Radiology
 Cardiology and Cardiothoracic Surgery
 Neurology and Neurosurgery
 Pediatric Surgery
 Nephrology and Urology
 Gastroenterology
 Endocrinology
 Pulmonary medicine

References 

1.Successful Treatment of Buschke–Löwenstein Tumour by Surgical Excision Alone by Gautam Nandakumar Gole, TY Shekhar, Sheetal G Gole and Shailaja Prabhala

2.An adult case of urinary tract infection with Kingella kingae: a case report by KV Ramana and SK Mohanty

3.Association of hyperhomocysteinemia to alcohol withdrawal in chronic alcoholics by K. Devika Rani, N. Suneetha, Shruti Mohanty and Pragna Rao.

4.Kamineni Medical College gets "A" grade from NAAC.

5.An epidemiological study on fluorosis in an urban slum area of Nalgonda, Andhra Pradesh, India.

External links 
Kamineni Medical College website
"NTR University of Health Sciences"
"Kamineni Education Society"
"Kamineni Hospitals"
"Swasthya09"

Medical colleges in Telangana
Private medical colleges in India
1999 establishments in Andhra Pradesh
Educational institutions established in 1999